A lily pad network is a series of wireless access points spread over a large area, each connected to a different network and owned by different enterprises and people, providing hotspots where wireless clients can connect to the Internet without regard for the particular networks to which they link.

This is in contrast with wireless community networks, where the access points route traffic between them, as well as a corporate wireless LAN where several access points are connected to the corporate network, and the members of the organization are supposed to stick to their own network.

Unlike a traditional corporate wireless LAN, which allows access to other networks only via access points connected to the main corporate network, a lily pad does not restrict a network user to connecting only to their own network. In this way, a lily pad network enables the network users to roam over a large area while staying connected, without needing the overheads of the access points to route traffic between the individual networks.

Lily pad networks derive their name from their frog-like "hopping" facility, where mobile stations which roam over a large area are akin to frogs, hopping from lily pad to lily pad, and because of the technology, remaining continuously connected. Unlike typical wireless mesh networks, where each network client needs to manage their own network connection continuity, a lily pad network topology enables roaming by linking a number of wireless access points together.

A lily pad network is particularly suitable for mobile wireless network connectivity over a large geographic area, such as a combination of coffee houses, libraries, and other public spaces. In these locations wireless access infrastructure is available for configuring the lily pad network to provide "hot spots", allowing a mobile station to connect to the Internet for both surfing or VoIP.

Wi-Fi
Network access